Maksim Rybakov (born 23 July 1993) is a Belarusian footballer playing currently for Spartak Shklov.

External links
 
 
 Profile at Pressball.by

1993 births
Living people
Belarusian footballers
Association football midfielders
FC Spartak Shklov players
FC Dnepr Mogilev players
FC Belshina Bobruisk players